Comunicazione Sonora is an album by the Gruppo Jazz Marca (Roberto Magris / Franco Testa / Franco Polisseni Trio) released in 1982 on the IAF (International Audio Film) label and reissued in 2005 by the English label Arision.

Reception

The Jazzwise review by Stuart Nicholson awarded the album 3  stars and simply states: "The album represents the debut of the then 22 year-old Italian pianist Roberto Magris in 1981 and is, by any standards, impressive."

Track listing
 Sguardo (Roberto Magris) - 5:20 
 Caccia Grossa (S. Magnoler) - 7:19 
 Comunicazione Sonora (F. Polisseni) - 2:17 
 Pierrot (Roberto Magris) - 5:30 
 Colori d’autunno (Roberto Magris) - 3:35 
 Messaggio (Roberto Magris) - 4:25

Personnel

Musicians
Roberto Magris - piano
 Franco Testa - electric bass
 Franco Polisseni - drums

References

Jazz albums
1982 albums